The  is a botanical garden located at 1018 Okamoto, Kamakura, Kanagawa, Japan. It is open daily except Mondays; an admission fee is charged.

The garden was founded in 1961 as the Prefectural Flower Center Ofuna Botanical Garden on a former site of the Kanagawa National Agricultural Experiment Stations. It currently contains about 5,700 species with notable collections of Azalea, Camellia, Iris kaempferi, Paeonia suffruticosa, Paeonia lactiflora, and Selaginella tamariscina.

See also 
 List of botanical gardens in Japan

References 
 Kanagawa Prefectural Ofuna Botanical Garden (Japanese)
 BGCI entry
 Kamakura City guide

Botanical gardens in Japan
Gardens in Kanagawa Prefecture
1961 establishments in Japan